Erupa lactealis is a moth in the family Crambidae. It was described by George Hampson in 1896. It is found in Rio de Janeiro, Brazil.

References

Erupini
Moths described in 1896